Yang Zhenchao (born August 1960) is a former Chinese politician, who served as Vice Governor of Anhui and Communist Party Secretary of Huainan. He was dismissed from his position in May 2016 for investigation by the Central Commission for Discipline Inspection.

Career
Yang was born in Jinzhai County, Anhui. He was graduated from Northeastern University and Renmin University of China and joined work in 1977. In 1983, he worked in Tongling Nonferrous Metals and became the manager from 1998 to 2003. He also served as director of SASAC of Anhui and director of Economic Committee of Anhui. In 2007, he elected as Communist Party Secretary of Huainan. In 2013, he was promoted to the post of Vice Governor of Anhui, ranked third; his tenure as vice-governor was said to be mediocre.

On May 24, 2016, Yang was placed under investigation by the Central Commission for Discipline Inspection, the party's internal disciplinary body, for "serious violations of regulations". Yang was the third provincial-ministerial level official in Anhui implicated in the anti-corruption campaign under Xi Jinping, and the first official of his seniority investigated during the second-round of inspections by the CCDI. He is expelled from the Communist Party on July 26, 2016. On May 3, 2017, Yang was sentenced to life in prison for bribery, plundering the public fund and abuse of power.

References

1958 births
Living people
People's Republic of China politicians from Anhui
People from Jinzhai County
Political office-holders in Anhui
Northeastern University (China) alumni
Renmin University of China alumni
Chinese Communist Party politicians from Anhui
Chinese politicians convicted of corruption
Expelled members of the Chinese Communist Party
Politicians from Lu'an